Steven Mark Drench (born 11 September 1985) is an English footballer who plays as a goalkeeper for Chorley.

Club career
Drench began his career with the Blackburn Rovers youth system. Following an injury to Ryan Robinson, he joined Conference National team Morecambe on loan as goalkeeping cover in November 2005. The loan was extended for a second month in December and to the end of the 2005–06 season in February.

Following his release by Blackburn, Drench signed for Morecambe permanently in the summer of 2006. After beginning the 2006–07 season competing with Robinson for the starting goalkeeper's spot, Drench was confirmed as the club's first choice goalkeeper when Robinson left to join Forest Green Rovers. However, he dislocated his elbow in a challenge with York City's Clayton Donaldson in the play-off semi-final second leg, which forced him to miss the successful play-off Final against Exeter City. He finished the season with 47 appearances and won Morecambe's Player of the Year award. Following this injury, he struggled to regain his first team place following the signing of Joe Lewis on loan and Drench joined Conference North team Southport on a month's loan in January 2008. His stayed at Southport until the end of the season and he made 26 appearances for the club.

After being released by Morecambe in June 2008, he signed for Southport permanently in July. However, he was allowed to leave the club on a free transfer and had a one-week trial with Conference team Stevenage Borough due to Drench's desire to remain full-time after the club reverted to part-time status following the departure of manager Gary Brabin to Cambridge United. Drench was reunited with Brabin after signing for Cambridge on a six-month loan on 21 August to provide cover for Danny Potter. He subsequently left the club following the expiration of the loan in January 2009.

Southport released Drench on 26 March 2009 and he signed for Leigh Genesis, finishing the 2008–09 season with five appearances for the team. He made 47 appearances in the 2009–10 season.

He had a trial with Conference team Barrow in July 2010 and he played in a pre-season friendly against Oldham Athletic. He later joined York City on trial and after featuring in pre-season friendlies against Hull City and Barnsley he was not offered a contract by the club.

He joined Conference North team Guiseley on trial in August, and played a large part in Guiseley's debut season in the Conference North. Drench was in goal as Guiseley earned promotion to the Conference National.

In 2017, Drench joined Bradford Park Avenue.

In 2019, Drench joined Altrincham and made his debut on 9 February against FC United.

In 2020, Drench joined Farsley Celtic. 

Following the conclusion of his contract, in 2021, he temporarily retired from football before re-joining Altrincham as a player / coach.

International career
Drench played for the England Schoolboys and England national under-17 team while with Blackburn.

References

External links

1985 births
Living people
Footballers from Manchester
English footballers
England youth international footballers
Association football goalkeepers
Blackburn Rovers F.C. players
Morecambe F.C. players
Southport F.C. players
Cambridge United F.C. players
Leigh Genesis F.C. players
Guiseley A.F.C. players
FC Halifax Town players
English Football League players
National League (English football) players
Bradford (Park Avenue) A.F.C. players
Altrincham F.C. players
Farsley Celtic F.C. players